Ken Kelley (born June 20, 1960) is a former American football linebacker who played two seasons in the United States Football League with the Philadelphia Stars, Chicago Blitz and Birmingham Stallions. He was drafted by the Philadelphia Stars in the 1983 USFL Territorial Draft. He played college football at Penn State University and attended Sterling High School in Somerdale, New Jersey.

Early years
Raised in Stratford, New Jersey, Kelley played high school football for the Sterling High School Silver Knights. He was a safety and linebacker for the Silver Knights before converting to quarterback his junior year. The team was 11-0 his senior season and garnered a number one ranking in New Jersey. In his four years playing for the Silver Knights, they won four Colonial Conference titles and reached the first four South Jersey Group 3 championship games, winning three of them. He was inducted into the Camden County Sports Hall of Fame in 2013.

College career
Kelley played college football for the Penn State Nittany Lions. He converted to linebacker for the Lions and was captain of the 1982 national championship team. He redshirted his freshman year.

Professional career

Philadelphia Stars
Kelley was drafted by the Philadelphia Stars in the 1983 USFL Territorial Draft. He played for the Stars during the 1984 season.

Chicago Blitz
Kelley played for the Chicago Blitz in 1984.

Birmingham Stallions
Kelley played for the Birmingham Stallions in 1985.

References

External links
Just Sports Stats
College stats

Living people
1960 births
Players of American football from New Jersey
American football linebackers
Penn State Nittany Lions football players
Philadelphia/Baltimore Stars players
Chicago Blitz players
Birmingham Stallions players
People from Stratford, New Jersey
Sportspeople from Camden County, New Jersey